Gerrit E. W. Bauer is a physicist and Professor and Principal Investigator at Tohoku University. He is one of the top highly-cited researchers (h>100) according to webometrics.

References 

Living people
Academic staff of Tohoku University
21st-century physicists
Year of birth missing (living people)